Fatuberliu is a town in the Fatuberlio Subdistrict, Manufahi District of East Timor.  Its population at the 2004 census was 6,902 (2010).

References 
 Statoids.com

Manufahi Municipality